Lorena C. Natividad-Borja (born August 10, 1974), also known as Lorie Natividad, Lorie Natividad-Borja or Lorie Borja, is a Filipino politician currently serving as the Vice Mayor of Valenzuela since 2016. She previously served as a councilor of Valenzuela from the 2nd District from 1998 to 2007 and again from 2010 to 2016. She also served as the officer-in-charge of Valenzuela's Youth, Sports and Livelihood Development Office from 2007 to 2009 and a sectoral representative to the then-municipal council of Valenzuela as the president of Sangguniang Kabataan from 1992 to 1996.

References 

1974 births
Living people
Nationalist People's Coalition politicians
People from Valenzuela, Metro Manila